is a passenger railway station in the city of Isumi, Chiba Prefecture, Japan, operated by the third-sector railway operator Isumi Railway.

Lines

Station layout
The station consists of a simple side platform serving the bidirectional single line, with a three-sided rain shelter built onto the platform. The station is unattended.

Adjacent stations

History
Kazusa-Nakagawa Station opened on April 1, 1930 as a station on the Japanese Government Railway (JGR) Kihara Line. After World War II, the JGR became the Japanese National Railways (JNR). Scheduled freight operations were discontinued from 1954, after which time the station has been unattended. With the division and privatization of the Japan National Railways on April 1, 1987, the station was acquired by the East Japan Railway Company. On March 24, 1988, the Kihara Line became the Isumi Line, operated by the Isumi Railway.

Passenger statistics
In fiscal 2018, the station was used by an average of 10 passengers daily.

Surrounding area
 Isumi City Multi-Purpose Hall
 Isumi Municipal Nakagawa Elementary School
 Isumi Municipal Nakagawa Kindergarten
 Nakagawa Police Station
 
 Arakine Dam
Poppo no Oka

See also
 List of railway stations in Japan

References

External links

 Isumi Railway station information 

Railway stations in Japan opened in 1930
Railway stations in Chiba Prefecture
Isumi Line
Isumi